The Cacunduva River is a river in the state of São Paulo, Brazil. 
It is a tributary of the Una do Prelado River.

Course

The Cacunduva River is the main tributary of the Una do Prelado River, the largest in the  Juréia-Itatins Ecological Station, a strictly protected area of well-preserved Atlantic Forest created in 1986.
The Una do Prelado rises in the Banhado Grande region to the south-west of the Serra da Juréia, and meanders in a north-east direction parallel to the Atlantic coast for  through a low plain between the Serra dos Itatins and the Serra da Juréia.
The Cacunduva is fed by streams from the Serra dos Itatins, flows east and joins the Una do Prelado from the left (north).

See also
List of rivers of São Paulo

References

Sources

Rivers of São Paulo (state)